George House may refer to:

People 
George House (California politician) (1929–2016), Republican member of the California State Assembly
George House (British politician) (1892–1949), Labour Member of Parliament for St Pancras North 1945–1949

Places in the United States 

George Farmhouse, Smyrna, Delaware, listed on the National Register of Historic Places (NRHP) in Kent County
Strong-Davis-Rice-George House, Eatonton, Georgia, listed on the NRHP in Putnam County
Stovall-George-Woodward House, Vienna, Georgia, listed on the NRHP in Dooly County
G. J. George House, Fairfield, Illinois, listed on the NRHP in Wayne County
George-Vest House, Verona, Kentucky, listed on the NRHP in Boone County
George House (Chaumont, New York), listed on the NRHP in Jefferson County
Lee & Helen George House, Hickory, North Carolina, listed on the NRHP in Catawba County
Charles Noden George House, Topton, North Carolina, listed on the NRHP in Graham County
Henry George Birthplace, Philadelphia, Pennsylvania, listed on the NRHP in Center City, Philadelphia
Samuel George House, Louisville, Tennessee, listed on the NRHP in Blount County
Murray-George House, Beloit, Wisconsin, listed on the NRHP in Rock County
Warren B. George House, Wauwatosa, Wisconsin, listed on the NRHP in Milwaukee County